The N class was a branch line steam locomotive that ran on Victorian Railways from 1925 to 1966.

History

In 1923, in response to the recommendations made by the 1921 Royal Commission on the matter of uniform railway gauge, VR announced a policy that all new locomotive designs were to be capable of conversion from broad to standard gauge. The rationale was that the task of converting VR from broad to standard gauge at a future date would be far easier to achieve if the existing locomotives and rolling stock could be easily modified for standard gauge operation, rather than requiring expensive re-engineering or replacement.

The K class 2-8-0 built by VR in 1922-23 was a success, but with a firebox mounted between frames engineered for broad gauge operation only, it was not readily gauge-convertible. Thus when additional branch line locomotives were required, the VR produced a 2-8-2 'Mikado' variant of the K, the first 2-8-2 tender engine in Australia. It retained the same wheels, cylinders, motion, and much of the frame of the K, but featured a longer boiler with a wider, larger grate, mounted above the frames and supported by a trailing truck. This enabled possible gauge conversion without radical re-engineering of the frames and grate.

Despite these design features, no N class locomotive ever ran on standard gauge. By the time the standard gauge Albury to Melbourne mainline opened alongside the existing broad gauge line in 1962, steam locomotives were rapidly being withdrawn from service. Large-scale standardisation of Australia's broad gauge rail network did not get under way until 1995, nearly thirty years after the withdrawal of the N class.

Production
Twenty N class locomotives were built by Newport Workshops between 1925 and 1928. A second batch of ten locomotives followed in 1930–1931. They went into service with road numbers N 110–139.

A third batch of fifty locomotives were later built by North British Locomotive Company in 1949-1950 as part of Operation Phoenix, the postwar rebuilding of Victorian Railways. A fourth batch of twenty N class of a modified design were also ordered from Newport Workshops. The class at this time was renumbered, with numbers 400-429 assigned to the pre-war Newport locomotives, 450-499 assigned to the North British locomotives, and 430-449 reserved for the postwar Newport locomotives. However, production of the fourth batch ceased in 1951 after just three had been built, as VR opted to order more of a new design of 2-8-0 branch line locomotive, the J class. 

VR sold ten of the North British-built N class locomotives (461, 465, 471, 474, 477, 485, 490, 491, 494 and 495) to the South Australian Railways, which was experiencing a severe motive power shortage. They became that system's 750 class. Many of these locomotives had only run a few days in VR service before being transferred to the SAR.

Thus although a total of 83 N class locomotives were built, only 73 were in actual VR service for a substantial period of time.

Regular service
The N class had an axle load almost as light as that of the K, and as such was able to traverse much of VR's light lines network built with  rail. It was however more limited in area of operation than the K, as its wheelbase was too long for the 50 and  turntables used on many branch lines.

Notwithstanding the limitation of their longer wheelbase, they were nevertheless widely used on both branch line and main line goods services. Later in their life, N class locomotives were a common sight assisting other locomotives on heavy wheat trains heading for the ports of Geelong or Portland, or shunting in yards such as Ararat.

A later highlight in the operating life of the class was the assignment of Newport-built N 430 for hauling the special Centenary-Jubilee Train in 1951, marking the centenary of the establishment of the Colony of Victoria and the jubilee of the establishment of the Commonwealth of Australia. This special train, containing valuable artworks and manuscripts from the National Gallery of Victoria as well as Commonwealth and Victorian Government displays, consisted of N 430 plus eleven coaches and a van painted in a special green and gold livery. It travelled  throughout Victoria from 1 February to 30 June 1951, visiting 168 stations and attracting 548,000 persons to inspect its onboard exhibits.

The ten N class locomotives sold to the South Australian Railways saw service on lightly built lines branching from Tailem Bend into the Murray Mallee. They were unpopular with crews owing to their cabs being more cramped than other SAR locomotives.

Design improvements

In 1927, class leader N 110 was equipped with a two-cylinder Franklin booster engine which drove the trailing truck axle. Based on the success of this device, VR built all but two of the much larger X class 2-8-2s with booster engines. VR also modified the design of the Delta trailing truck on the second (1930-31 built) batch of N class locomotives to enable easy retrofitting of booster engines. Despite this, no further boosters were ever fitted, and in 1945, N 110's booster was removed and fitted to one of the two non-booster equipped X class locomotives.

In 1936, class leader N 110 was again selected to test new features, this time a series of design changes for improved drafting and reduced cylinder back pressure referred to as "modified front end", which had already been successfully applied to the C class locomotive. N 110's performance was dramatically improved, and all the original thirty N class locomotives were similarly equipped. The most visible change resulting from these enhancements was that their original cast iron funnels were replaced by a less ornate "flowerpot" funnel. They also received other improvements during this period, such as the fitting of cross-compound air compressors and smoke deflectors.

The postwar N class locomotives had a revised boiler design featuring a combustion chamber firebox and thermic syphons. The final batch of three Newport-built locomotives had a further evolution of the design, with German "Witte"-style smoke deflectors, and boxpok wheels.

With industrial action in the late 1940s threatening black coal supplies, the VR began to convert the class to burn fuel oil commencing with N 460 in September 1951. However, only 36 conversions were completed before the program was cancelled in 1956 amid the arrival of large numbers of diesel electric locomotives.

Demise
The introduction of the T class diesel electric locomotive from 1955 onwards on VR's branchlines led to progressive retirement of the N class. Many were put into storage, to be used only for seasonal grain traffic. Wholesale withdrawals occurred during 1965 and 1966. The final run of the class was in October 1966, when N 468 and N 475 hauled an Australian Railway Historical Society special passenger train.

In South Australia, the new 830 class diesel electrics began to displace branchline steam power. Most of the 750 class was withdrawn by 1962; locomotive 752 steamed for the last time in November 1964.

Preservation

Despite the relatively large number of N class locomotives built, all but one of the 73 locomotives remaining on the VR after 1951 were scrapped.

N 432, the last of the group of three N locomotives built by Newport Workshops in 1951, was withdrawn from service in 1966 after a service life of just . It is preserved at the Newport Railway Museum. As well as its historical value as the only remaining N class locomotive, N 432 is also notable for being the last steam locomotive built by VR's Newport Workshops.

In addition to N 432, one of the ten North British Locomotive Co. built locomotives sold to the SAR also remains.

A preservation group is engaged in a project to construct a Victorian Railways N class. A feasibility study has been conducted for the N441 Steam Locomotive Project to investigate the viability of converting a K class frame into that of a 1st series Victorian Railways N class, using locomotive K 154's frames and wheels together with one of the remaining spare N class boilers, and constructing a trailing axle with components acquired from a number of state heritage assets.

Model railways

HO Scale
The North British version of the N class was released as an HO brass ready-to-run model by Alco Models. Later, Broad Gauge Models produced a brass and Whitemetal kit in HO scale. Precision Scale Models released a limited run of brass ready-to-run models in the mid-1990s. Trainbuilder released a series of locomotives, including N420, 422–425, 450 and 468, and SAR 750, 752 and 755 as coal burners, and oil burners 426-432 (with 430 in Jubilee green) and 453 and 498.

References

Further reading 
 Dee et al., Power Parade, VicRail Public Relations Division, Melbourne, 1981, 
 Pearce et al., North Williamstown Railway Museum, ARHS, Melbourne, 1980,

External links 

 victorianrailways.net N class locomotive page Details and further photographs of N class locomotives
 Les Brown Train Pics - Roll 9 A photographic essay of the ARHS "Farewell N class" special hauled by N 468 and N 475 in October 1966

2-8-2 locomotives
N class
NBL locomotives
Railway locomotives introduced in 1925
Freight locomotives
Broad gauge locomotives in Australia